Andrés Zuno, (born November 7, 1982) is a Mexican actor and singer. Known for being the first mexican actor to star in an American Soap Opera The Bold and the Beautiful. Also known for his starring role as Esteban in  Todo por Lucy, the latin remake of the TV classic I Love Lucy  for Amazon Studios. He played Hugo in one of the most successful telenovelas of all time in the United States Al Diablo con los Guapos also for the recurring role of Plutarco in the first and second seasons of the Telemundo super-series Señora Acero, and for his roles in the Televisa's number one hit telenovelas such as La doble vida de Estela Carrillo and Papá a toda madre, where he played the first gay character to be legally married in mexican television.'' He is also member of the original cast of Mexico’s smash musical Mentiras el musical and the author and producer of the novel and play Los Hijos También Lloran.

Filmography

Film roles

Television roles 

| 2022
| “  Todo por Lucy Season 1  “
| Esteban
| Series regular; 10 episodes Season one

References

External links 
 

Male actors from Mexico City
Mexican male film actors
Mexican male telenovela actors
21st-century Mexican male actors
Living people
1982 births